The 2021–22 TaiwanBeer HeroBears season was the franchise's 1st season, its first season in the T1 League, its 1st in Taipei City. The HeroBears are coached by Yang Chih-Hao in his first year as head coach.

Draft 

The HeroBears doesn't select any players on 2021 T1 League draft.

Standings

Roster 

<noinclude>

Game log

Hsinchu JKO Lioneers Masters Game

Preseason

Regular season

Regular season note 
 Due to the COVID-19 pandemic preventive measures of Taipei City Government, the T1 League declared that the games on January 22 and 23 would postpone to May 7 and 8.
 Due to the COVID-19 pandemic in Taiwan, the T1 League declared that the game on January 29 would postpone to April 30. And the games at the Kaohsiung Arena would play behind closed doors since January 28 to 30.
 Due to the COVID-19 pandemic in Taiwan, the T1 League declared that the games at the University of Taipei Tianmu Campus Gymnasium would play behind closed doors since April 4 to 10.
 Due to the player of the TaiwanBeer HeroBears tested positive, the T1 League declared that the game on April 30 would postpone to May 6.
 Due to the Taoyuan Leopards cannot reach the minimum player number, the T1 League declared that the game on May 6 would postpone to May 19.
 Due to the TaiwanBeer HeroBears cannot reach the minimum player number, the T1 League declared that the games on May 7 and 8 would postpone to May 18 and 20.

Play-in

Play-in note 
 The fourth seed, TaiwanBeer HeroBears, was awarded a one-win advantage before play-in series.

Semifinals

Player Statistics 
<noinclude>

Regular season

Play-in

Semifinals

 Reference：

Transactions 
On September 9, 2021, Maciej Lampe signed with the TaiwanBeer HeroBears. On December 24, Maciej Lampe took a plane to Spain for recovery. On February 4, 2022, TaiwanBeer HeroBears indicated that they got the agreement with Maciej Lampe not to restart the contract.

Trades

From Taiwan Beer

Free agents

Additions

Subtractions

Awards

Yearly Awards

MVP of the Month

References 

2021–22 T1 League season by team
TaiwanBeer HeroBears seasons